Antichloris eriphia is a moth of the family Erebidae. It was described by Johan Christian Fabricius in 1777. It is found in Trinidad, Suriname, Guyana and the Brazilian states of Pará and Rio de Janeiro. The moth has been recorded infrequently since 1985 in Great Britain, imported with bananas.

References

External links

Euchromiina
Moths described in 1777
Moths of the Caribbean
Moths of South America
Taxa named by Johan Christian Fabricius